Shert (Bet) is a 2015 Pakistani romantic drama serial. It was directed by Shaqielle Khan, produced by Momina Duraid and written by Irfan Mughal. It starred Danish Taimoor, Ayesha Khan, Syed Jibran, Nida Khan and Nadia Hussain in lead roles. The drama serial premiered on 4 April 2015 on Urdu1, and aires a new episode every Friday at 9:00pm PST. The Last Episode was slated to release on 24 July 2015 concluding the series with 17 episodes. It also aired in India on Zindagi as Na Gumaan Kar Kisi Aur Ka.

Plot
Momal, Immad, Afroz and Sameer are four university friends who share a very friendly bond. Immad has a crush on Momal but Momal loves Sameer. One day when Imaad goes to Momal to confess his feelings for her she says him to first take her proposal to sameer. Imaad is shocked. He talks to sameer and he agrees. Meanwhile, afroz is known to like Imaad and she proposes to him. One year has passed Momal is married to sameer and Afroz to Immad. Momal and Sameer live in US while Imaad and Afroz in Karachi. Sameer is secretly eyeing on his boss(Sofia) who is a divorced women. Sofia agrees to marry sameer on the condition that he divorces Momal. Sameer has a fight with Momal and she knows about his affair. She leaves him and moves to Pakistan. In Pakistan She lives with Imaad and Afroz. Momal has lost her faith in men but Afroz hasn't as she thinks that they are men like Imaad. Momal and Afroz bet on Imaad. Momal claims that she will make Imaad move to her in a couple of days while Afroz is adamant that her husband is not one of those men who eye on women.

Momal, Imaad and Afroz move for vacations to the hill station where they meet Sameer, who asks Momal to forgive him as Sofian has kicked him out and betrayed him. She slaps him and says never to return. But destiny intervenes and Imaad revokes his love for Momal. Momal wins the bet but she doesn't want to break Afroz's house so she moves to an apartment. Imaad tells to Afroz that he loved Momal from the time of university. Afroz is devastated. She questions Momal. Momal is mentally disturbed and tries to suicide but is saved. Afroz feels sorry for Momal and agrees on Imaad marrying Momal. It is found that Aftoz can never get pregnant and this becomes a source of tension for Afroz and Imaad.

Sameer tells Afroz that it's just lust what Imaad has for Momal and a desire to have a child. Imaad marries Momal. Sameer is leaving for good sobhe contacts Momal. Momal insists Imaad to meet Sameer. At sameer's apartment Imaad and Sameer are both Shocked to find out that Momal married Immad just to halala (an Islamic practice where a woman has to marry another man and then divorce to marry her ex-husband ). Sameer is ecstatic but Imaad is devastated and has a nervous breakdown. Sameer and Momal summon Imaad and Afroz to court. Sameer wants Momal to say in court that Imaad is unable to have a child and that he has made a fake file to portray that Afroz cannot conceive. Momal is a bit reluctant at first but stands against them.

Imaad is shocked to see what Momal is doing but Afroz is clear that Momal was here just to correct her life and disturb them. Meanwhile, Afroz's friends arrive after vacations and are equally tensed to know about what happened while they were gone. Afroz visits Momal and insults her and even calls her a betrayer. Imaad tries to reach Momal but Sameer stops him by pointing a gun at him when Imaad tries to meet Momal. Momal and Sameer finalise in court that Imaad is impotent. But later it is known that Momal is pregnant with Immad's child. Sameer wants her to abort the child while Imaad is persistent on having his first child. Momal is tensed and confused on what to do. Afroz leaves Immad and requests him to live a happy life with Momal and his child.

Last Episode
Afroz is pregnant but only she and Imaad's best friend Sami know. Momal is leaving Pakistan forever without Sameer or anyone else and before leaving she tells Imaad that she is returning her case from the court. Afroz has an accident and Imaad is told by Sami that she has had a miscarriage and now she can not conceive but in reality Afroz is still expecting Immad's child. In the end Sami is able to get Afroz and Imaad together(Imaad gets to know that Afroz never had any miscarriage) while Sameer and Momal also patch up as the four live happily.

Cast
 Danish Taimoor as Imaad
 Ayesha Khan as Momal
 Syed Jibran as Sameer
 Nida Khan as Afroz
 Birjees Farooqui as Aapa Jan
 Nadia Hussain as Sofia (Boss)

Soundtrack

The Theme song of Shert is written by Sabir Zafar, and composed by Waqar Ali. The song was highly appreciated by the audience and called one of the favourite OST of 2015. The music is a label of Momina Duraid Productions. The song is sung by Aleyha waqar.

References
 http://www.brandsynario.com/shart-urdu1-drama-danish-taimoor-ayesha-khans-sizzling-chemistry-back-on-screen/
 http://style.pk/danish-taimoor-and-ayesha-khan-back-on-screen-after-long-time/
 http://reviewit.pk/shart-episode-01/

2015 Pakistani television series debuts
2015 Pakistani television series endings
Pakistani romantic drama television series
Urdu 1 original programming
Urdu 1
Zee Zindagi original programming